The Robert W. Gordon "Inferno" Collection is about 200 pages of original and typescript copies of correspondence and letters that were separated from the main collection of the Archive of Folk Song, Library of Congress, by Robert W. Gordon, first head of the folklife department in the Library of Congress, or a third party, due to their bawdy and scatological subject matter. In January 1974, Debora Kodish, folklorist and founder of the Philadelphia Folklore Project, prepared a 14-page index to the collection that lists informant, date, location and title of the texts.

See also
American Folklife Center
Archive of Folk Culture

References

External links
Gordon 'Inferno' Collection: Index  by Debora Kodish 1974-01; revised by Jack Horntip 2004-08
Folk-Songs of America: The Robert Winslow Gordon Collection, 1922-1932

Library of Congress